Mianabad-e Malek (also Romanized as Mīānābād-e Malek; also known as Mīānābād) is a village in Qoroq Rural District, Baharan District, Gorgan County, Golestan Province, Iran. At the 2006 census, its population was 761, in 185 families.

References 

Populated places in Gorgan County